Newcomer Glacier is a glacier  long transecting the north part of the Sentinel Range, flowing from the vicinity of Allen Peak southeast between Gromshin Heights and the main ridge of range, and then east between Gromshin Heights and Sostra Heights to where it leaves the Sentinel Range north of Bracken Peak and south of Foros Spur. Named by the Advisory Committee on Antarctic Names (US-ACAN) for Commander Loyd E. Newcomer of U.S. Navy Squadron VX-6, pilot on photographic flights over the range on December 14–15, 1959.

Tributary glaciers
 Anchialus Glacier
 Sabazios Glacier
 Vidul Glacier

See also
 List of glaciers in the Antarctic
 Glaciology

Maps
 Newcomer Glacier.  Scale 1:250 000 topographic map.  Reston, Virginia: US Geological Survey, 1961.
 Antarctic Digital Database (ADD). Scale 1:250000 topographic map of Antarctica. Scientific Committee on Antarctic Research (SCAR). Since 1993, regularly updated.

Further reading
 Damien Gildea, Mountaineering in Antarctica: complete guide: Travel guide
 James G. Bockheim, The Soils of Antarctica, P 172
 Zhigang Peng, Jacob I. Walter, Richard C. Aster, Andrew Nyblade, Douglas A. Wiens and Sridhar Anandakrishnan, Antarctic icequakes triggered by the 2010 Maule earthquake in Chile, P 2

References
 

Glaciers of Ellsworth Land